SMART Infrastructure Facility (SMART) is a research institution in Wollongong, Australia. SMART is an acronym for "simulation, modelling, analysis, research and teaching".
It opened in 2011 as Australia's first multi-disciplinary applied infrastructure research and training facility.

History
The facility was created through funding from:
 $35 million from the Australian federal government (through the 2007 the Higher Education Endowment Fund
 $10 million through RailCorp;
 $16 million from the University of Wollongong;
 Approx $800,000 from state government authorities (Queensland Rail, Integral Energy and Geoscience Australia), industry (BlueScope,  Cisco Systems Australia and Cognos), and other research bodies (Australian Bureau of Statistics and CSIRO)

Research groups
SMART's commissioned research program ranges from big data on cities, economic analysis and scenario planning tools for land use and transport. They investigate how infrastructure can be better designed, delivered and managed to meet the changing needs of the society over the long term.

Research groups contribute to specific commissioned research projects, and promote academic key performance indicators such as publications, HDR students and competitive research grants. Commissioned research projects and consultancies fund the facility through revenue and strategic partnerships.

The seven research groups consist of:
Advanced Geomatics for Regional and Urban Planning
Applying System of Systems Methodologies
Computer Simulation for Sustainable Transport Systems
Computational Intelligence for Optimal Decision and Operation
Economics and Governance
Geo-social Intelligence for Urban Resilience and Liveability
Social Simulation for Demographic Analysis and Transitions

Henry Ergas is a professor there.

References

External links
 SMART Infrastructure Facility website

Institutes of the University of Wollongong